Tay Sound is an uninhabited natural waterway within Qikiqtaaluk Region, Nunavut, Canada. It is located at the northern end of Baffin Island, south of Oliver Sound.  Its mouth opens to Eclipse Sound.  Pond Inlet is the nearest community.

Sounds of Qikiqtaaluk Region